The Eagle's Eye is a 1918 American serial film consisting of 20 episodes that dramatizes German espionage in the United States during World War I. The stories are based on the experiences of William J. Flynn during his career as chief of the United States Secret Service from 1912–1917.

It features King Baggot as the president of the Criminology Club and Marguerite Snow as a Secret Service agent who investigate spies. Among the events depicted are the sending of the Zimmermann Telegram, Franz von Rintelen's attempts to sabotage cargo loading in San Francisco Harbor, and the capture of the German espionage plans. It was directed by George Lessey, Wellington A. Playter, Leopold Wharton, and Theodore Wharton, and produced by the Whartons Studio. The serial is now considered lost. Because this serial was a commercial failure, it was the last one made by Whartons due to the studio being forced to declare bankruptcy.

Background 
After Flynn's retirement from the Secret Service his work investigating sabotage during the war were interwoven with fictitious characters and events by Courtney Ryley Cooper into a 20-part spy thriller. These were also published as weekly installments in The Atlanta Constitution's magazine section during 1918 under the title The Eagle's Eye: A True Story of the Imperial German Government's Spies and Intrigues in America. Fifteen of the episodes were republished as chapters in a book the following year.

Cast
 King Baggot as Harrison Grant
 Marguerite Snow as Dixie Mason
 William Bailey as Heinrich von Lertz
 Florence Short as Madame Augusta Stephan
 Bertram Marburgh as Count Johann von Bernstorff
  as Captain Franz von Papen
 John P. Wade as Captain Karl Boy-Ed
 Fred C. Jones as Dr. Heinrich Albert
 Wellington A. Playter as Franz von Rintelen
 Louise Hotaling
 Louis C. Bement as Uncle Sam
 Allan Murnane
 F.W. Stewart
 Robin H. Townley
 Bessie Wharton as Mrs. Blank

Chapter titles

 Hidden Death
 The Naval Ball Conspiracy
 The Plot Against the Fleet
 Von Rintelen, the Destroyer
 The Strike Breeders
 The Plot Against Organized Labor
 Brown Port Folio
 The Kaiser's Death Messenger
 The Munitions Campaign
 The Invasion of Canada
 The Burning of Hopewell
 The Canal Conspirators
 The Reign of Terror
 The Infantile Paralysis Epidemic
 The Campaign Against Cotton
 The Raid of the U-53
 Germany's U-Base in America
 The Great Hindu Conspiracy
 The Menace of the I.W.W.
 The Great Decision

References

External links 

 

1918 films
American spy films
American war films
Film serials
Films directed by George Lessey
Films set in San Francisco
Lost American films
World War I spy films
American silent serial films
American black-and-white films
1918 lost films
1910s spy films
Cultural depictions of Franz von Papen
1910s American films
Silent war films